Isorenieratene  is a carotenoid light harvesting pigment with the chemical formula C40H48. Isorenieratene and its derivatives are useful to marine chemists studying the carbon cycle as biomarkers that indicate photic zone anoxia.

Isorenieratene is produced by green sulfur bacteria (Chlorobium) which perform photosynthesis using hydrogen sulfide rather than water:

H2S + CO2 → SO42− + organic compounds

Such anoxygenic photosynthesis requires reduced sulfur (and therefore strictly anaerobic conditions) and light (hν). This combination of conditions is very unusual nowadays, since it requires very stratified water columns to achieve a sharp density gradient, i.e. a constrained basin with fresh water flowing, or warm water on top of cooler water. Green sulfur bacteria are commonly found in meromictic lakes and ponds, sediments, and some sinkholes. Some marine environments, such as certain fjords and the Black Sea also fulfill these criteria. At such depths, sunlight has a very different wavelength profile than at the surface, so isorenieratene is used instead of chlorophyll to harvest light for photosynthesis.

See also
 Carotene

References

Carotenoids